Great Sankey is a civil parish in the Borough of Warrington in Cheshire, England, and is a suburb to the west of the town of Warrington. It contains seven buildings that are recorded in the National Heritage List for England as designated listed buildings, all of which are at Grade II. This is the lowest of the three gradings given to listed buildings, applied to "buildings of national importance and special interest". The parish is almost completely residential. The listed buildings consist of a church and a sundial in its churchyard, a railway station, a mounting block, a former pillbox, and two milestones.

See also
Listed buildings in Bold, St Helens
Listed buildings in Burtonwood and Westbrook
Listed buildings in Penketh
Listed buildings in Warrington (unparished area)

References
Citations

Sources

Listed buildings in Warrington
Lists of listed buildings in Cheshire